The Peruvian skate (Bathyraja peruana) is a large skate found in the southeast Pacific Ocean, off the coasts of Peru, Ecuador, and Chile. Very little is known about its biology.

Description 
The margin of the disc is almost straight from the tip of the snout to the tip of the disc, with a slight convexity from the level of the nostrils to the level of the gills. The straight disc margin can be used to distinguish B. peruana from B. aguja which has undulating margins. Coloration on most of the surface is brownish-grey, but ranges from brown to yellow on the margins of the nostrils, mouth, pelvic fins, and base of the tail. The disc has dermal denticles but generally lacks thorns (some specimens have small thorns just anterior to the axil of the pectoral fins). The tail has 25 small, oval-based midrow thorns.

References 

Bathyraja
Taxa named by John D. McEachran
Taxa named by Tsutomu Miyake
Fish described in 1984